July 2013

See also

References

 07
July 2013 events in the United States